Kevin Warrick is a golfer that finished low amateur at the 2002 U.S. Open.

College career
Warrick was individual runner-up at the 2001 NCAA Division II Men's Golf Championships while being a member of the team champions for University of West Florida.  He was a two-time All-American.

National championship play

2000 U.S. Amateur
At the 2000 U.S. Amateur Warrick finished with low round of the day on the lower course at Baltusrol Golf Club.

2002 U.S. Open
Warrick was the low amateur at the 2002 U.S. Open where he shot 27-over par and was the only amateur to make the cut.  In the final round, he was paired with John Daly.

Results in major championships

LA = Low amateur

References

American male golfers
Living people
Year of birth missing (living people)